Guellal is a town and commune in Setif Province in north-eastern Algeria.

References

Communes of Sétif Province